Polybrachiorhynchidae is a family of worms belonging to the order Heteronemertea.

Genera:
 Polybrachiorhynchus Gibson, 1977
 Polydendrorhynchus Yin & Zeng, 1986

References

Heteronemertea
Nemertea families